William Morin may refer to:

William H. Morin (1869–1935), United States Navy officer
Will Morin, Canadian politician